The Tarbagatai Mountains (translit. The name of the mountain derived from Mongolian word: in Traditional Mongolian alphabet:  ( "tarvaga", meaning "marmot") with suffix  ( "-tai"; literally "to have" or "with").

Many Tarbagan marmot live in this mountain range. Their name does not have a direct translation from the English in Mongolian, as it would mean "marmot's marmot".

An eastern extension of the Tarbagatai is the Saur Range.

Drainage 
As it is common for mountain ranges, there is more precipitation in the Tarbagatai mountains than in the adjacent flatlands. The mountains are thus an important watershed. Streams from the northern slopes of the Tarbagatai flow into Lake Zaysan, which eventually drains (via the Irtysh) into the Arctic Ocean. The streams of the southern slope, many of which merge into  the Emil River, flow into the Emin Valley, part of the endorheic Balkhash-Alakol Basin; they are an important source of water for several counties of Tacheng (Tarbagatay) Prefecture in China. The Urzhar has its sources in the range.

References 

Mountain ranges of Kazakhstan
Mountain ranges of Xinjiang